Žarko Mićin (born 1982) is a lawyer and politician in Serbia. He served in the National Assembly of Serbia from 2014 to 2021 as a member of the Serbian Progressive Party and is now chief of staff to the mayor of Novi Sad.

Private career
Mićin is a graduate of the University of Novi Sad Faculty of Law. He served as the director of JP Zavod za izgradnju grada in 2012 and of SPC Vojvodina in 2013. In 2014, he became executive director of JP "Urbanizam" Zavod za urbanizam Novi Sad.

Politician

Provincial and municipal politics
Mićin sought election to the Assembly of Vojvodina in the 2012 provincial election, running in Novi Sad's fifth division. He was defeated in the second round. He was also given the fiftieth position on the Progressive Party's electoral list for the Assembly of Novi Sad in the 2012 Serbian local elections. The list won fifteen mandates, and he was not elected.

In November 2020, he was appointed as chief of staff for Novi Sad mayor Miloš Vučević.

Parliamentarian
Mićin received the 130th position on the Progressive Party's Aleksandar Vučić — Future We Believe In list in the 2014 Serbian parliamentary election and was elected when the list won a majority victory with 158 out of 250 mandates. He was promoted to the eighty-ninth position in the successor Aleksandar Vučić – Serbia Is Winning list in the 2016 election and was re-elected when the alliance won a second consecutive majority with 131 seats.

During the 2016–20 parliament, Mićin was a member of the European integration committee and the committee on the judiciary, public administration, and local self-government; a member of the European Union–Serbia stabilization and association committee; a deputy member of Serbia's delegation to the NATO Parliamentary Assembly (where Serbia has observer status); the leader of Serbia's parliamentary friendship group with Hungary; and a member of the parliamentary friendship groups with Armenia, Azerbaijan, Brazil, Canada, China, France, Germany, Greece, India, Iran, Ireland, Israel, Italy, Japan, Liechtenstein, the Netherlands, Norway, Russia, Slovenia, Spain, Switzerland, and the United States of America.

Mićin also became a substitute member of Serbia's delegation to the Parliamentary Assembly of the Council of Europe in October 2017. He served with the European People's Party group and was an alternate member of the committee on legal affairs and human rights.

He received the 128th position on the Progressive Party's Aleksandar Vučić — For Our Children coalition list in the 2020 Serbian parliamentary election and was elected to a third term when the list won a landslide majority with 188 mandates. He continued to serve as a full member of the judiciary committee and was a deputy member of the European integration committee and the stabilization and association committee and a full member of Serbia's delegation the NATO parliamentary assembly. He again led Serbia's parliamentary friendship group with Hungary and was a member of the friendship groups with China, France, Germany, and the United States of America.

Mićin resigned from the assembly on 3 March 2021.

Electoral record

Provincial (Vojvodina)

References

1982 births
Living people
Politicians from Novi Sad
Members of the National Assembly (Serbia)
Substitute Members of the Parliamentary Assembly of the Council of Europe
Members of the NATO Parliamentary Assembly
Serbian Progressive Party politicians
European People's Party politicians